The 2014 KNVB Cup Final was a football match between PEC Zwolle and Ajax on 20 April 2014 at De Kuip, Rotterdam. It was the final match of the 2013–14 KNVB Cup competition and the 96th Dutch Cup final. PEC Zwolle beat Ajax 5–1 to secure their first KNVB Cup trophy.

The match saw major crowd disturbance from Ajax fans, who were throwing fireworks on the pitch. This caused the referee to suspend the match in the fifth minute with the score at 0–1. After a half-hour interval, play was resumed.

Route to the final

Match

Details

See also
 Fireworks incident

References

2014
2013–14 in Dutch football
PEC Zwolle matches
AFC Ajax matches
April 2014 sports events in Europe
Sports competitions in Rotterdam
21st century in Rotterdam